Valiasr Street or  Pahlavi Street is a tree-lined street in Tehran, dividing the metropolis into western and eastern parts which were built in 1922 to 1927 respectively, considering the end of asphalt plan it ended in 1933. It is considered one of Tehran's main thoroughfares and commercial centers. It is also the longest street in the Middle East, and was reported as one of the longest in the world by former BBC (now Al Jazeera) journalist Rageh Omaar during the television documentary Welcome to Tehran.

The street was built by Reza Shah Pahlavi's order and called the Pahlavi Street. After the 1979 Islamic Revolution the street's name was changed initially to Mossadeq Street (in reference to the former nationalist prime minister Mohammad Mossadegh) and later to Valiasr (a reference to the 12th Shi'ite Imam). This vibrant, hub-like street is lined with many shops, restaurants, parks, and cultural centers situated along this long avenue.

Environmental concerns
The plane trees of Valiasr Street have always been a major element of the street's identity and one of Tehran's irreplaceable landmarks. After the Islamic Revolution in Iran, due to sever mismanagement, the living conditions of the trees have been constantly deteriorated causing immense public concerns. The number of trees were decreased from 24,000 in 1946 to 12,000 in 1995. In 2012 only 8,288 trees were left.
The main contributing issues are including but not limited to:

 destruction of natural waterflow networks such as rivers and springs;
 irregular watering;
 water contamination;
 soil contamination;
 damages to the roots of the trees by the increased population of the rats, poor curbing, pouring concrete foundation for construction projects;
 soil erosion and exposure of the tree roots to the air;
 mistreatment of the trees by humans;
 air pollution;
 lack of sunlight exposure due to high-rise building. 

In only one of several incidents, in July 2022, a property owner poisoned 13 trees intentionally just for a better visibility of the building's façade. 
The concern for the trees of Valiasr Street is reflected in the Grammy Award winning song Baraye.

Shopping
Valiasr Avenue is the main Shopping street in Tehran and the whole of Iran. Many foreign chain stores have branches on this street like Benetton Group (three stores), Reebok, Adidas, etc. Many important shopping centers of Tehran are located on Valiasr street like the Tandis Center (located at the northeast point of the street at Tajrish Sq.), the Safavieh Mall, the Eskan Shopping center and many more. Many luxury jewelry and accessories stores such as Rolex and Tag Heuer are located on this street. Furthermore, hundreds of other local stores are located at Valiasr.

Other

 Many cinemas, restaurants, and hotels are located on this street.
 Tehran City Theatre
 Mellat Park and Saéi Park (two of Tehran's most visited parks)
 jomhori Intersection Grand Bazzar
 cinema museum 
 central building of the Iranian Red Crescent Organization
 valiasr hospital
 shahid rajaie Research-Therapeutic-Medical Center

Location
Valiasr runs from Tehran's railway station ( elevation above sea level) in the south of the city to the Tajrish square ( elevation above sea level) in the north.

Valiasr runs for 12 miles (19.3 kilometers), north to south, and is filled with traffic at all hours, even until the early hours of the morning. The shops stay open late and the kiosks sell fresh fruit juice, coffee and newspapers.

Gallery

See also
List of upscale shopping districts

References

External links

Pictures of Tehran

Streets in Tehran
Shopping districts and streets